The Kingdom of Upper Burgundy was a Frankish dominion established in 888 by the Welf king Rudolph I of Burgundy on the territory of former Middle Francia. It grew out of the Carolingian margraviate of Transjurane Burgundy (Transjurania) southeast of ('beyond') the Jura Mountains together with the adjacent County of Burgundy (Franche-Comté) in the northwest. The adjective 'upper' refers to its location further up the Rhône river, as distinct from Lower Burgundy (Cisjurane Burgundy and Provence) and also from the Duchy of Burgundy west of the Saône river. Upper Burgundy was reunited with the Kingdom of Lower Burgundy in 933 to form the Kingdom of Burgundy, later (from the 12th century) known as Kingdom of Arles or Arelat.

History

Transjurania originally was a duchy of the Carolingian Empire, covering the Central Plateau from the Jura Mountains up to the Great St Bernard Pass in the Western Alps. It thereby roughly corresponded to western Switzerland, i.e. the parts west of the Brünig-Napf-Reuss line, including the Romandy with the cities of Geneva, Lausanne and Sion, as well as the cantons of Aargau, Berne and Valais and adjacent parts of the French départements Haute-Savoie and Ain, as well as the Aosta Valley which today belongs to Italy. Together with the Burgundian comital estates around Besançon and Dole on the Doubs river northwest of the Jura range, the Transjurane territories became part of the short-lived Middle Frankish realm of Emperor Lothair I upon the 843 partition by the Treaty of Verdun.

Kingdom of Lotharingia

Upon the second partition by the Treaty of Prüm and Emperor Lothair's death in 855, his second son Lothair II subsumed his portion of Upper Burgundy into his Middle Frankish kingdom of Lotharingia, while his younger brother Charles received Cisjurane Burgundy and the Kingdom of Provence. When Charles died in 863, Lothair II also gained some northern districts of the deceased's kingdom. The Provence territory in the south passed to the eldest brother King Louis II of Italy.

The Transjurane duchy was then ruled by Hucbert, a scion of the Bosonid dynasty, the younger son of Count Boso the Elder of Arles, and through his sister Teutberga brother-in-law to King Lothair II. Hucbert, however, fell out of favour after Lothair II divorced Teutberga, was defeated at the Battle of Orbe in 864 and replaced by Count Conrad II of Auxerre from the Elder House of Welf (Rudolfings), who from 866 ruled Transjurania as a margrave. When Lothair II died without heirs in 869, his Lotharingian realm was divided into a West and East Frankish part between his uncles Charles the Bald and Louis the German by the 870 Treaty of Meerssen.

Emperor Charles the Fat, son of Louis the German, by 884 had once again reunited all Carolingian territories, except for the Lower Burgundian Kingdom of Provence established by Boso of Vienne in 879. When Charles was deposed and died in 888, the Carolingian Empire disintegrated again. The nobles and leading clergy of Upper Burgundy assembled at the Abbey of St. Maurice, Agaunum and elected the Transjurane margrave Rudolph I, son of Conrad II, King of Burgundy.

Kingdom of Upper Burgundy
At first, King Rudolph I tried to re-unite the Lotharingian realm of late Lothair II, but strong opposition by the East Frankish king Arnulf of Carinthia forced him to focus on his territory of Transjurania and the western Franche-Comté estates. Arnulf acknowledged Rudolph's rule in Upper Burgundy, but finally declared his illegitimate son Zwentibold King of Lotharingia in 895. 

Rudolph was married with Guilla of Provence (Willa), probably a daughter of the Lower Burgundian king Boso. After his death in 912, he was succeeded by his son Rudolph II. His widow secondly married Count Hugh of Arles, who succeeded as King of Lower Burgundy in 924.

Rudolph II attempted to enlarge his realm by attacking the adjacent territories of the German stem duchy of Swabia in the northwest. He advanced towards the Upper Rhine river and in 916 occupied the city of Basel. However, he again lost the Swabian estates of Thurgau and Zürichgau when he was defeated by the forces of Duke Burchard II in the 919 Battle of Winterthur. To make peace, he married Burchard's daughter Bertha.

From this point, Rudolph II began to campaign in the Kingdom of Italy, allied with the rebellious margrave Adalbert I of Ivrea and defeated Emperor Berengar I at Fiorenzuola in 923. The next year, he was crowned Italian king. His rule was, however, contested by insurgent nobles, and they summoned his stepfather, the Lower Burgundian king Hugh of Arles, who marched against Italy. In the tense situation, Rudolph's father-in-law Duke Burchard II of Swabia hurried to help, but was killed at Novara by the henchmen of Archbishop Lambert of Milan. Hugh had Rudolph expelled from Italy and gained the Iron Crown of Lombardy at Pavia in 926. 

In 933 Rudolph II finally came to terms with Hugh: he waived all claims to Italy and in return gained Hugh's Lower Burgundian kingdom, thus re-uniting the two territories. Rudolph's descendants from the Elder House of Welf, Conrad the Peaceful (937–993) and Rudolph III (993–1032), succeeded him in this united Kingdom of Burgundy. 

Upon the extinction of the Welf line in 1032, Burgundy was incorporated by Emperor Conrad II as the third constituent kingdom of the Holy Roman Empire, after Germany and Italy, having defied claims raised by Count Odo II of Blois. Thereupon the King of the Romans and Holy Roman Emperor assumed the title of a Burgundian king. The title of a Burgundian 'rectorate', referring to the former Transjuranian margraviate, was re-created for the Swabian ducal House of Zähringen by King Lothair II of Germany in 1127.

Rulers of Upper Burgundy

Hucbert (?–864)
Conrad II, Duke of Transjurane Burgundy (864–876)
Rudolph I of Burgundy (876–912), king from 888
Rudolph II of Burgundy (912–937), also King of Lower Burgundy from 933
Conrad I of Burgundy (937–993), also King of Lower Burgundy
Rudolph III of Burgundy (993–1032), also King of Lower Burgundy
Line extinct, Burgundian kingdom united with the Holy Roman Empire

See also
Burgundy (disambiguation)
Kingdom of Burgundy
Duchy of Burgundy

History of Burgundy
Medieval Switzerland
Former monarchies of Europe